Maria "Marijke" Kegge-Deege (born 26 July 1957) is a Dutch sprint canoer who competed in the early 1980s. At the 1980 Summer Olympics in Moscow, she was eliminated in the semifinals of the K-2 500 m event.

References
 

1957 births
Canoeists at the 1980 Summer Olympics
Dutch female canoeists
Living people
Olympic canoeists of the Netherlands
Sportspeople from The Hague